Simone Marie Jeanne Berger (16 September 1923 – 29 March 2020), better known as Simone Sylvestre, was a French film actress. Sylvestre died on 29 March 2020, at the age of 96.

Filmography 
 1941: Ne bougez plus by Pierre Caron
 1941: Premier rendez-vous by Henri Decoin: a resident of the orphanage
 1942: The Strangers in the House by Henri Decoin: a journalist
 1944: Les Petites du quai aux fleurs by Marc Allégret: Édith
 1945: Félicie Nanteuil by Marc Allégret: Mme de Ligny
 1946: Twilight by Jean Dréville: Simone
 1946: Pétrus by Marc Allégret: Francine
 1947: La Femme en rouge by Louis Cuny: Irmène
 1949: Between Eleven and Midnight by Henri Decoin : Léone
 1955: Frou-Frou by Augusto Genina: Ketty
 1955: M'sieur la Caille by André Pergament: a girl
 1955: Razzia sur la chnouf by Henri Decoin:  the man's partner with the gun
 1956: Elena and Her Men by Jean Renoir: a friend of Henri
 1957: L'Aventurière des Champs-Élysées by Roger Blanc: Monique

References

External links 
 Simone Sylvestre
 Simone Sylvestre
 Simone Sylvestre
 Complete filmography
 

1923 births
2020 deaths
Actresses from Paris